Rolde is a village in the Dutch province of Drenthe. Located in the municipality of Aa en Hunze, it lies about 6 km (3.7 mi) east of Assen. In 2021, Rolde had a population of 3,905.

History
Rolde was a separate municipality until 1998, when it became a part of the newly-established municipality of Aa en Hunze.

Although facilities are limited, Rolde possesses a ten-pin bowling alley. There are also two hunebeds on a site east of the church. The windmill has been restored to working order.

Gallery

References

External links

Municipalities of the Netherlands disestablished in 1998
Populated places in Drenthe
Former municipalities of Drenthe
Aa en Hunze